Charles E. Jefferson is a former Democratic member of the Illinois House of Representatives, who represented the 67th District from April 2001 to July 2014. He served as Assistant Majority Leader. He resigned from the Illinois House of Representatives July 1, 2014. He was a member of the Winnebago County Board prior to serving as a State Representative.

References

External links
Representative Charles E. Jefferson (D) 67th District at the Illinois General Assembly
By session: 98th, 97th, 96th, 95th, 94th, 93rd
 
Rep. Charles E. Jefferson at Illinois House Democrats

1945 births
Living people
Democratic Party members of the Illinois House of Representatives
African-American state legislators in Illinois
21st-century American politicians
County board members in Illinois
21st-century African-American politicians
20th-century African-American people